The 1912 Idaho football team represented the University of Idaho in the 1912 college football season. Idaho was led by eighth-year head coach John G. Griffith.

In the season opener in neighboring Pullman, Idaho posted the first of two straight wins over Washington State in the Battle of the Palouse,  Rival Montana was not played this season.

Schedule

One game was played on Friday (at Washington State in Pullman) and one on Thursday (at Whitman in Walla Walla on Thanksgiving)

References

External links
 Gem of the Mountains: 1914 University of Idaho yearbook (spring 1913) – 1912 football season
 Official game program: Idaho at Washington State – October 18, 1912
 Go Mighty Vandals – 1912 football season
 Idaho Argonaut – student newspaper – 1912 editions

Idaho
Idaho Vandals football seasons
Idaho football